Langdon is an unincorporated community in Atchison County, Missouri, United States.  It is located about six miles southwest of Rock Port. Its post office has closed and mail is now delivered through Fairfax.

Langdon was laid out in 1880. The community was named after John Langdon, a railroad official. A post office called Langdon was established in 1880, and remained in operation until 1979.

The Thompson-Campbell Farmstead was listed on the National Register of Historic Places in 2003.

References

Unincorporated communities in Atchison County, Missouri
Unincorporated communities in Missouri